Swarna Rekha (Subarnarekha) Express is a daily express service between Dhanbad and Jamshedpur. It is a day train and covers the distance of 186 km in 5 hours and 40 minutes, at an average speed of 32 km/h. It has AC chair car, second-class sitting, and general type of coaches. All classes except general class require prior reservation, whereas general coaches can be boarded with a general daily ticket.
No pantry car is available in the train. The Tatkal scheme is available in this train.

Major stations through which it passes are Pathardih Junction, Bhojudih Junction, Purulia Junction and Chandil Junction.

It has one loco reversal, at Adra Junction.

References

External links
 Swarna Rekha Express India Rail Info

Transport in Dhanbad
Transport in Jamshedpur
Named passenger trains of India
Rail transport in West Bengal
Rail transport in Jharkhand
Express trains in India